The following is a list of attractions and landmarks in and around Edmonton, Alberta, Canada.

Downtown

Alberta Legislature Building
Art Gallery of Alberta (formerly Edmonton Art Gallery)
Chinatown
Citadel Theatre
Edmonton City Hall
Edmonton Ski Club
EPCOR Tower (current tallest building in Edmonton by spire)
Francis Winspear Centre for Music
 Gibson Block flatiron building
High Level Bridge Streetcar, from Downtown to Whyte Avenue
Hotel Macdonald
Ice District
Edmonton Tower
Grand Villa Casino
JW Marriott Edmonton
Rogers Place
Edmonton Oilers NHL team
Stantec Tower viewing deck
Little Italy
MacEwan University City Centre Campus
MacEwan Centre for Sport and Wellness
North Saskatchewan River valley parks system
RE/MAX Field (formerly Telus Field)
Royal Alberta Museum
Shaw Conference Centre
Sir Winston Churchill Square
Ukrainian Canadian Archives & Museum Of Alberta
Warehouse District; 104 Street
City Market, a downtown farmer's market

North
Alberta Railway Museum
Alberta Aviation Museum
Joe Clarke Athletic Grounds
Clarke Stadium
Commonwealth Stadium
Edmonton Eskimos CFL team
Northern Alberta Institute of Technology (NAIT)
Northgate Centre
Northlands (formerly Northlands Park)
Edmonton Expo Centre (formerly Agricom)
K-Days
North Town Centre
Telus World of Science (formerly Edmonton Space and Sciences Centre)
124 Street Area

West

Edmonton Corn Maze
Edmonton Valley Zoo
Snow Valley Ski Club
West Edmonton Mall
Galaxyland (formerly "Fantasyland")
World Waterpark

South

Castrol Raceway (formerly Capital City Raceway & Labatt Raceway)
Fort Edmonton Park
Mill Woods Park
Old Strathcona
Catalyst Theatre
Garneau Theatre
Kinsmen Field House
Queen Elizabeth Pool
Ritchie Mill
Strathcona Canadian Pacific Railway Station
Strathcona Farmers Market
Varscona Theatre
Walterdale Theatre
Whyte Avenue
South Edmonton Common
Southgate Centre
University of Alberta Main Campus
Clare Drake Arena
Foote Field
Northern Alberta Jubilee Auditorium
Rutherford House
Universiade Pavilion (Butterdome)
William Hawrelak Park

East

Abbottsfield Mall
Concordia University College of Alberta
Edmonton Queen, a river-boat
Muttart Conservatory
Rundle Park
Strathcona Science Provincial Park

External links
City of Edmonton
Edmonton Tourism
Travel Alberta - Edmonton
Museums and Archives listing for Edmonton and area from Alberta Heritage 

Tourist attractions in Edmonton
Edmonton
Edmonton